Ana Maria Raffo Guevara is an Ecuadorian politician who represents the Guayas Province at the National Assembly. She is a member of the Democratic Center.

Life
In 2008 she was working as a government manager for the Republic's President. By 2014 she had been promoted to be one of his advisors. She left that employment in 2017 when she became an advisor to the National Assembly.

She joined the Democratic Center party and at the 2021 election she was elected to represent the Guayas Province at the National Assembly. Her substitute was Barahona Kelber Bermudez. She sits on the "Permanent Commission on Education, Culture, Science, Technology, Innovation and Ancestral Knowledge".
 Other members of that commission include Zolanda Pluas, Mariuxi Sanchez and Isabel Enriquez.

In June 2022 she was among the members who requested a debate concerning the replacement of President Guillermo Lasso because of his alleged mismanagement. Forty-six other members supported the proposal including Vanessa Álava, Jhajaira Urresta, Patricia Mendoza, Victoria Desintonio, Viviana Veloz and Rosa Mayorga. In February 2023 she was accusing Lasso's government of stealing democracy from the people.

References

Living people

Year of birth missing (living people)
21st-century Ecuadorian women politicians
21st-century Ecuadorian politicians
Members of the National Assembly (Ecuador)
Women members of the National Assembly (Ecuador)